Brayan Jesús Alcócer Narváez (born 17 August 2003) is a Venezuelan professional footballer who plays as a forward for Mineros de Guayana.

Club career
Alcócer was loaned to fellow Venezuelan Primera División club Deportivo La Guaira in 2020, but due to the COVID-19 pandemic in Venezuela, he did not feature. On his return to Mineros de Guayana for the 2021 season, he became the youngest player to score for Mineros in the Copa Sudamericana.

International career
Alcócer has represented Venezuelan at youth international level. He starred for Venezuela at the 2023 South American U-20 Championship.

Career statistics

Club

References

2003 births
Living people
People from Ciudad Guayana
Venezuelan footballers
Venezuela youth international footballers
Association football forwards
Venezuelan Primera División players
A.C.C.D. Mineros de Guayana players
Deportivo La Guaira players